Kuusalu JK Rada was a football club in Kuusalu, Estonia.

It was formed in 1994 and it currently plays in II Liiga North/East. It dissolved after the 2017 season.

Players

Current squad
 ''As of 25 July 2016.

Statistics

League and Cup

References

Football clubs in Estonia
Kuusalu Parish
Association football clubs established in 1994